Close to the Edge is a British structured reality television show that started airing on BBC Four in September 2015. The show follows a group of pensioners from Bournemouth, with many scenes being improvised. It has drawn comparisons with Made in Chelsea and The Only Way is Essex which follow a similar format.

Cast
Barbara 'Babs' Fowler
Chris Dowding
Vanessa Coleman
John Seaton
Dee Major
Simon Cowen
Jan Bishop
Beate Braban

References

External links

2015 British television series debuts
2015 British television series endings
2010s British reality television series
BBC Television shows